Kunzea obovata is a flowering plant in the myrtle family, Myrtaceae and is endemic to eastern Australia. It is a spreading shrub with unusually-shaped leaves and clusters of pink to purple flowers. It is restricted to northern New South Wales and south-eastern Queensland.

Description
The leaves are egg-shaped with the narrower end towards the base, have a dished upper surface and a down-turned tip. The flowers are arranged in clusters of up to eighteen or more flowers on the ends of the branches.

Taxonomy and naming
Kunzea obovata was first formally described in 1982 by Norman Byrnes and the description was published in Journal of the Adelaide Botanic Garden. The specific epithet (obovata) is a Latin word meaning "egg-shaped".

Distribution and habitat
This kunzea grows in forest in soils derived from granite, on the tablelands north from Deepwater. It is conserved in national parks including Girraween and Boonoo Boonoo National Parks.

References

obovata
Flora of New South Wales
Myrtales of Australia
Plants described in 1982
Taxa named by Norman Brice Byrnes